Englynion y Clywaid (or Englynion y Clyweit) is a collection of Welsh stanzas.

The stanzas date to around the 10th century or the late 12th or early 13th century according to Ifor Williams, as well as other academics.
The earliest manuscript witnesses are Jesus College MS 3 (c. 1350) and NLW Llanstephan MS 27, the Red Book of Talgarth (c. 1400), the latter almost exclusively in the hand of Hywel Fychan, main scribe of the Red Book of Hergest).

The series consists of 73 stanzas with proverbs that are attributed to characters from Welsh folklore or Welsh saints.

Style 
The poems are melodic, with each englyn beginning with the opening phrase "A glyweist-di a gant...?" ("Did you hear what ... said/declaimed?"), followed by the name of a character from Welsh tradition, or one of the Welsh saints. The answer is in the form of a traditional proverb, most of which are attributed to characters from Welsh folklore, or Welsh and foreign saints. The exceptions are those given in the mouths of animals.

The selection of Welsh characters includes a number of characters from Culhwch and Olwen, and the work as a whole describes a selection of mythical, historical or semi-historical heroes and Christian saints.

History 
The poem is a reflection of the antiquarian interest of the 13th and 14th centuries when there was a great deal of collecting, composing and recording of proverbial material by learned Welshmen in a spirit which is compared by Kenneth H. Jackson to the antiquarian mindset that later spurred on the editors of The Myvyrian Archaiology of Wales in the early 19th century.

Cynfarch fab Meirchion 
One poem describes a proverb attributed to Cynfarch fab Meirchion of the Hen Ogledd (Old North):"Did you hear Cynfarch sing? 

'Bid thy shoulder upon thy horse; 

And we will not respect nor revere you."Other heroes include Llywarch Hen, Heledd, Urien Rheged , Gwenddolau and Geraint fab Erbin. From the world of legends there are characters such as Culhwch, Drystan, and Cadriaith mab Seidi . The author has a particular fondness for South Wales saints, including Idloes, David , Padarn , Gwynllyw and Teilo, which suggests he is a native of South Wales.

References

Welsh poetry
13th-century poems